The national symbols of Catalonia are flags, icons or cultural expressions that are emblematic, representative or otherwise characteristic of Catalonia or Catalan culture. 

The oldest Catalan symbol is the coat of arms of Catalonia, based on the royal arms of the Crown of Aragon, though a number of theories trace its origin to even older times. It is one of the oldest coats of arms in Europe. A legend, considered non-historical, says that the four red bars (Quatre Pals or Quatre Barres) are the result of Charles the Bald, known also as Charles II, king of West Francia, smearing four bloodied fingers over Wilfred the Hairy's golden shield, after the latter had fought bravely against the Normans.

Catalonia's national symbols as defined in the Statute of Autonomy of Catalonia are the flag, Catalonia's day, and the anthem. These symbols have often a political and revindicative significance. Other symbols may not have official status, for different reasons, but are likewise recognised at a national or international level.

One of the highest civil distinctions awarded in Catalonia is the St George's Cross (Creu de Sant Jordi).

Official national symbols

Other official symbols and distinctions

Historical symbols

Certain institutions from the former Principality of Catalonia, like the Catalan constitutions, the Usatges, the Consell de Cent, the Catalan Courts and the Generalitat are valued as historical symbols of ancient local forms of government by Catalans.

Owing to a common history and shared experiences, as well as interactions at different levels along the centuries, many of the traditional Catalan symbols overlap with those of Aragon, Valencia and the Balearic Islands. This is often cause of controversies, as it is often difficult to resolve conflicts regarding differing perceptions of the culture, the history and the language issues surrounding what was the former Crown of Aragon and the culturally Catalan geographic areas. Places like the Poblet Monastery where the ancient kings lie buried are especially revered as common symbols that helped consolidate Catalonia in the 12th century.

Historical symbols of a military nature

In former times the existence and very survival of Catalonia depended on being victorious in the constant battles against the Saracens. Therefore, many ancient Catalan symbols are of a warlike nature, like Otger Cataló, also known as Pare de la Pàtria ("Father of the Country"), the Nou Barons de la Fama, James the Conqueror, the Almogavars, Bernat de Rocafort and the Comte Tallaferro. Present-day "moros i cristians" popular festivals still commemorate the battles against the Moors (or Muslims) that allowed the Catalans to endure the invasions.

The national anthem of Els Segadors, as well as the sickle, date back to the Reapers' War (1640 - 1659), while the Timbaler del Bruc (drummer of El Bruc) commemorates the resistance against Napoleon I's troops in Catalonia during the Peninsular War  (1808 - 1814).

Religious symbols

Ancestral symbols, like the Virgin of Montserrat, Saint George, other Virgins and Saints, as well as the Pessebre, the Nit de Reis and the Christmas celebrations, are derived from the Christian doctrine. These symbols were fruit of a time when churches or cathedrals were in the centre of Catalan towns and respect for priests was not questioned. The Christian cross and the colors of the sacrifice of Christ, white and red for "body and blood", inspired a great part of the Catalan traditional emblems. Some old Christian symbols are now subject to controversy, for present-day society in Catalonia is in a state of Postchristianity, seeing itself as more secular than its traditional ancestry.

The names of many villages, cities and mountains all over Catalonia, like Santa Susanna, Sant Sadurní d'Anoia, or Sant Llorenç del Munt, as well as a great number of chapels and hermitages spread all over the territory, remain as a testimony of the ancestral faith of the Catalans. In recent times, however, these symbols have seen their meaning much reduced. While until the 19th century all Catalans felt represented by their symbols of Christianity, nowadays only a few consider them relevant.
Already in 1905 writer and bishop Josep Torras i Bages (1846–1916), convinced that the Catalan nation had to be Christian in order to establish itself as something enduring and meaningful in the future, strongly criticized the secularism displayed by the "militant nationalism" of Enric Prat de la Riba (1870–1917).

According to Torras i Bages, the seny (a kind of good sense and wisdom), another Catalan symbol, was based in ancient Catalan traditions. Analyzing this controversy, Mossèn Gaietà Soler i Perejoan (1863–1914) came to the conclusion that "there are two "opposing visions" in Catalonia, from one side the Catholic (one), based on "seny" and tradition, aiming to promote benevolent social restoration ... of the faith and social and legal customs of Catalonia...", and on the other side "the unconcerned (vision), based on what is politically convenient, in order to achieve, rather than social improvement, (merely) the political prestige of a nation-state."

Folkloric and popular symbols 

 
Aside of the symbols of a historic, political and religious character, there are other popular Catalan symbols which are more or less serious according to the case and the context.

Many of these symbols come from the local folklore, like the sardana dance, the Castellers and the gegants i capgrossos, as well as the dragon, and its derivations, the cucafera, the vibria and the bat. The choosing of a "Pubilla" in the summer fairs comes from an old tradition based on the transmission of hereditary patrimony in rural Catalonia.

While other peoples and nations have a "national bird" or a "national flower", Catalonia does not have much in the way of tongue-in-cheek popular established symbols, even though the yellow weaver's broom (Spartium junceum) has often been regarded as such in literature, specially in combination with red poppies. The "ruc català" or "burro català" (Catalan donkey) is a relatively recent creation when the need was felt to produce something Catalan to oppose to the Central Spanish Osborne bull, widely perceived by Catalans as a centralistic symbol, alien to their culture.
 
Still, certain traditional and "typical" symbols deserve mention, like Patufet, the St George's Day red rose, the Nit de Sant Joan bonfires, the correfoc, the barretina traditional hat, the porró, the Tió de Nadal and the caganer.

One of the most famous international symbols of Catalonia is FC Barcelona. The area's footballing branch is supported with a passion by its fans, the culés. Each season Barça engages in one of La Liga's most famous rivalries, El Clàssic against long-time rivals Real Madrid. To a lesser extent the USAP Perpignan rugby team is also considered, especially by some Catalan nationalists, as an unofficial national team of Catalonia.

Geographic symbols

Mountains like the Canigó, Montserrat and the striking double-peaked Pedraforca, are ancestral symbols endowed with mythical attributes according to the local folklore.

Certain cities of the Catalan cultural area have a symbolic significance as the most extreme geographic points of the spoken Catalan language or one of its variants. These are: Salses, the northernmost, Guardamar (Valencian), the southernmost, Maó (Menorquí), the easternmost, and Fraga, the westernmost.

Gastronomic symbols

The "botifarra amb mongetes" (local sausage with beans) is perhaps the most representative Catalan dish. Other representative Catalan cuisine dishes are the faves a la catalana, prepared with tender broad beans and botifarra, escudella i carn d'olla, esqueixada, escalivada, and finally pa amb tomàquet, as well as the embotits that are eaten along with it.

The Calçot is a type of scallion or green onion known as blanca gran tardana in the Catalan language from Lleida. A calçotada is an annual event in Tarragona celebrating the harvest of Calçot. It is grilled on high fire, wrapped up in newspaper, served on terra cotta tiles and eaten after peeling with bare hands by dipping one by one in romesco sauce along with an accompaniment of red wine and bread. It is followed by roasted lamb meat and sausage and white beans, for dessert oranges and white cava.

Among the typical Catalan desserts and sweets, the most famous are "mel i mató" (local cottage cheese with honey), crema catalana and coca. The torró (nougat) is eaten during Christmas time.

Political symbols
El Pi de les Tres Branques ("the three-branched pine") is an individual pine tree located in the municipality of Castellar del Riu in northern Catalonia. Since the late 19th century it has been seen as a symbol of the unity of the three "Catalan countries" and been a venue for political and cultural gatherings.

Gallery

See also
 History of Catalonia
 Traditions of Catalonia
 Auca (cartoon)
 Seny

References

Andorran culture
Catalan nationalism
 
Catalonia
French culture
Spanish culture
Symbols of Europe